Cirsium nuttallii, called Nuttall's thistle, is a North American species of plants in the tribe Cardueae within the family Asteraceae.  The species is native to the coastal plain of the southeastern and south-central United States, from eastern Texas to southeastern Virginia.

Cirsium nuttallii is a biennial or perennial herb up to 350 cm (almost 12 feet) tall, with a large taproot. Leaves are up to 60 cm (24 inches) long with thin, green on the upper side but gray to white on the underside because of numerous woolly hairs; spines along the edges of the leaves. There are a few flower heads, each head with white, pink, purple or lavender disc florets but no ray florets.

References

External links
Discover Life

nuttallii
Flora of the Southern United States
Plants described in 1818